The Vichada River is a blackwater river in the country of Colombia, South America. It flows into the Orinoco River.

The eastward course of the Vichada is offset by an impact structure, called the Vichada Structure.  The structure is most likely the largest impact structure in South America.

References

Rivers of Colombia
Orinoco basin